Schinia accessa is a moth of the family Noctuidae. It is found in Texas, southern Arizona, Colorado and Mexico.

The wingspan is about 27 mm.

The larvae feed on Artemisia tridentata.

References

accessa
Moths of North America
Moths described in 1906